The tenth season of British science fiction television series Doctor Who began on 30 December 1972 with the tenth anniversary special The Three Doctors, and ended with Katy Manning's final serial The Green Death. This is the Third Doctor's (played by Jon Pertwee) fourth series, as well as fourth for producer Barry Letts and script editor Terrance Dicks.

Casting

Main cast 
 Jon Pertwee as the Third Doctor
 Katy Manning as Jo Grant

Jon Pertwee continues his role as the Third Doctor, and Jo Grant played by Katy Manning makes her final appearance in The Green Death.

Recurring and guest cast
 Nicholas Courtney as Brigadier Lethbridge-Stewart
 John Levene as Sergeant Benton
 Richard Franklin as Mike Yates
 Roger Delgado as The Master
 Patrick Troughton as the Second Doctor
 William Hartnell as the First Doctor

Nicholas Courtney, John Levene and Richard Franklin continue their recurring roles of UNIT personnel Brigadier Lethbridge-Stewart, Sergeant Benton and Captain Mike Yates respectively.

Previous lead actors William Hartnell and Patrick Troughton return to guest as the First and Second Doctors in the programme's tenth anniversary serial, The Three Doctors, although illness limited Hartnell's involvement. This was the first time that previous incarnations of the Doctor had returned to the programme, in what would become a regular feature of anniversary episodes.

Roger Delgado makes his final appearance as The Master in Frontier in Space. He died in a car crash in Turkey shortly after the story's transmission.

Serials 

At the conclusion of The Three Doctors, the Doctor is finally released from his sentence of exile by the Time Lords, enabling him to travel through time and space once again. This ends the cycle of mostly Earth-bound stories where the Doctor was stranded that began at the conclusion of The War Games in 1969.

The serials Frontier in Space and Planet of the Daleks both feature the Daleks and lead directly from the first into the second, forming a rough twelve-part epic.

Broadcast
The entire season was broadcast from 30 December 1972 to 23 June 1973.

Home media

VHS releases

DVD and Blu-ray releases

In print

References

Bibliography 

 
 

1972 British television seasons
1973 British television seasons
Season 10
Season 10
10